This is a list of roads and highways numbered 1351.

United States
  Farm to Market Road 1351

United Kingdom 

 B1351

See also

References

1351